Darryl Bill Suasua  (born 1966) is the current head coach of Counties Manukau in the Mitre 10 Cup, and a former coach of the New Zealand women's national rugby union team. He coached the Black Ferns for seven years in which they won both the 1998 and 2002 Women's Rugby World Cups. They also won the 1996 and 2000 Canada Cups.

Suasua also coached the New Zealand women's sevens side for the 2009 Rugby World Cup Sevens in Dubai. They lost to Australia in the finals 10–15.

Suasua was also a Backs Assistant Coach for  under Head Coach Stephen Betham.

In the 2018 Queen's Birthday Honours, Suasua was appointed a Member of the New Zealand Order of Merit, for services to rugby.

References

1965 births
Living people
New Zealand rugby union coaches
New Zealand national rugby sevens team coaches
Members of the New Zealand Order of Merit
Place of birth missing (living people)
New Zealand women's national rugby union team coaches